The Tamworth Phoenix are an American football team based in Coleshill, Warwickshire, England,  who compete in the BAFA National Leagues Premier Division North, the highest level of British American football. 
They operate from Pack Meadow in Coleshill, but represent the Town of Tamworth. Formed in 2004, The Phoenix are one of the most successful American Football teams in the UK and have won four back-to-back Premier Division North titles from 2016 to 2019. In 2017 they won Britbowl XXXI in 2017 against the London Blitz at Sixways Stadium in Worcester.

History

Early history
The Phoenix were founded in 2004 by Dave Winter, Jay Alexander, Ed Winter and Ryan Baker, after re-establishing youth football in the area, as the Tamworth Trojans, a year earlier. In their first season 2008, the Phoenix came 2nd in the BAFL2 Central conference behind champions the Nottingham Caesars. However, they avenged this by defeating them in the playoffs en route to a BritBowl 2 final defeat to the London Cobras, also a first year club.

Despite defeat in the BritBowl 2 final, Tamworth Phoenix were promoted to BAFL1 division and placed in the South-West Conference. The Phoenix completed the regular season with a record of 9–1, winning the South-West Conference, and moved into the playoffs as the #2 seed. After a victory over the Kent Exiles in the first round of the playoffs, their run was halted at the semi final stage by the East Kilbride Pirates.

In the 2010 season, Tamworth completed a perfect 10–0 season, and a perfect post-season, winning the BritBowl against the East Kilbride Pirates, and moving to the BAFACL Premiership. It was a memorable season for the Phoenix as earlier in the year they had the chance to compete against the Australian Gridiron team as part their tri-nations warm up, and matched-up well, only losing 27–22 to the tourists.

Graham Kelly took over from Jay Alexander as Head Coach, and began life in the Premier League with a win against the East Kilbride Pirates at Lichfield Rugby Club. They built on this success with a 5-5 regular season record with victories over some of the established premiership teams. They were defeated by the London Warriors in the semi-finals of the Play-offs.

The 2014 season was the most successful Premiership campaign for the Phoenix. Having secured the second seed in the Northern Conference, the team beat the Bristol Aztecs in the National Playoffs before succumbing to the London Warriors in the Semi Final.

2015 saw the appointment of James Hossack as Team President, and Martin Hilton to the position of Head Coach (the fourth in the team's short history) and a fledgling partnership with the Atherstone Sports Hub, where the Phoenix will play their home games.

The next three seasons saw a serious up-tick in performances on the field. In 2015 the Phoenix finally defeated old-rivals East Kilbride in a regular season fixture, before a shock defeat at home to Sheffield saw them relinquish pole position in the conference, but a strong performance away at the defending champion London Warriors in the semi gave hope for things to come.

2016 saw a series of firsts for the club; namely the first undefeated regular season in the Premier League, and the team's first Conference crown, which paved the way for the Phoenix's first home playoff tie. Unfortunately they couldn't hold the momentum, as they lost to the London Blitz.

National success
In 2017, the Phoenix continued their successes in the regular season by once again running the table against BAFA Premier North opposition, scoring nearly 500 points in the process. The highlight of the season was a 62–3 win against the Merseyside Nighthawks in the last week of the season, going into the play-offs.

Despite being considerable underdogs, the Tamworth Phoenix took a 28–7 lead against the London Warriors in the Semi Final, before the reigning National Champions fought back to take the lead in the fourth quarter. A Will Hussey touchdown, Alex Lenkowski Field Goal, and two huge defensive stands saw the Phoenix outlast the Warriors, and earn a shot at the national title.

In the National Final on 26 August, at Sixfields Stadium Worcester, Tamworth faced the London Blitz for Britbowl XXXI. Pat Daley opened the scoring, before the Blitz answered back. Daley Scored another, before Lenkowski added a field goal to give the Phoenix a 17–7 lead just before the half.

A resurgent Blitz added a scores either side of the interval to give them the lead, before Daley threw an interception which lead to another London score. As the Phoenix trailed 28–17, Tamworth fought back. First through a Daley to Hussey touchdown pass, before Lenkowski reduced the deficit to 28–27. With 8 minutes left in the game, Ben Davies stepped in front of a Joe Thompson pass, to score an interception return and secure the 34–28 win.

Pat Daley was named Britbowl MVP, and the London Blitz were condemned to a fifth Britbowl defeat in as many years.

European football and the Jason Scott era
Martin Hilton announced his retirement shortly after Britbowl XXXI, with long-time Coordinator Jason Scott being handed the reigns. Scott was part of the first Phoenix staff that helped establish the team, and his return from coaching in the United States coincided with James Hossack being named President.

As National Champions the Phoenix were invited into the Northern European Football League alongside the Carlstad Crusaders, Oslo Vikings and Copenhagen Towers. The Nix went to Copenhagen full of confidence, as they trounced the Manchester Titans 57–6 in the opening game of the 2018 season, but were handily dispatched by a much bigger, more physical Towers team. A closer fought game against the Carlstad Crusaders brought another defeat, but the Nix rallied to beat the Oslo Vikings 47–12 in the final match day in the NEFL.

The Nix romped to another undefeated regular season, and a third consecutive Northern Conference Title, scoring 552 points per game whilst leaking only 59, they beat the London Blitz in the National Semi Finals 30–17, setting up another trip to Britbowl.

In a rainy day in Leeds, at the John Charles Stadium, the Tamworth Phoenix took on the London Warriors, who also made light work of their conference. Despite both teams boasting stingy defenses, the game was a shootout, won eventually by the Warriors 48–34.

The 2019 season saw many retirements; with stand-out players Tom Levick, Adam Hope and Will Hussey deciding to hang up their cleats. Talismanic quarterback Pat Daley joined the Hamburg Spartans in GFL2, joining Will Hobbs, Lewis Thomas and Wayne Drew in Europe. A total of 17 players left the club during the offseason, leading to a rebuilding year for the Phoenix.

Despite the high turnover of players, it was largely business as usual for Tamworth, despite the Manchester Titans handing the Phoenix their first regular season loss in four seasons. A 7–6 win against the London Blitz in the Semi Finals, set up a repeat date with the Warriors in Britbowl XXXIII

Youth team
In February 2012 a new team was introduced, the youth team. The youth team games last 30 minutes and it is 5 vs 5. They faced a difficult first season having to forfeit nine games due to lack of players, but competed well against established teams like Standish Raiders, Birmingham Bulls and the Leicester Falcons.

In 2013, the appointment of Andrew Garrett brought new optimism to the Youth Program. Andrew Garrett had been promoted to the position of head coach. The following season they saw huge improvements on the field, beating Coventry Jets in the opening game of the year. They continued a rich vein of form by beating an experienced Yorkshire Rams team, before narrowly losing to Leicester. They also hosted their first home tournament, and built links for the future. 2014 brought more success as the Youth Team won their first tournament in Doncaster, and made the playoffs for the first time in their history.

Coaching staff

Head Coach:TBC 
Defensive coordinator: TBC
Offensive coordinator: TBC 
Special Teams Coordinator: tbc 
Defensive assistant coaches: TBC
Offensive assistant coaches: tbc 
Phutures Head Coach: Karl Burgess
Defensive coaches: TBC
Offensive coaches: TBC

Roster

Quarterbacks
 Pat Daley
 Sam Huxtable
 Angus Cook

Running backs
 Adam Hope
 Elliot Walters
 Alex Lenkowski
 Deji Ali
 Marc Bonazebi

Wide receivers
 Ben Burslem
 Jack Versing
 James Hossack
 Will Hussey
 Will Hussey
 Adam Hennessey

Offensive linemen
 Tom Levick
 Jonny Allred
 Rob Stirling
 Jon Maisey
 Joshua Gaff
 Lewis Thomas
 David Pemberton
 Harry Elton Dobbin

Defensive linemen
 Steve Gregory
 Ash Miller
 Declan Hutchinson
 Ovie Omueda
 Wayne Drew
 Will Stone
 Araan Dass
 Piotr Wrozek
 Anton Bailey
 Nick Smith

Linebackers
 Ben Davies
 Will Jepson
 Nelson Charles-Nwufoh
 Chris Thacker
 Andy Mortimer
 Sam Jordan-Turner
 Raphael Omozusi
 Dan Shodipo
 Jareth Webster

Defensive backs
 Matt Gawne
 Dan Hampton
 Junior Shodipo
 James Ramsay
 Oli Campbell
 Josh Cooper
 Cassian Graham

Seasonal records

External links 
 Tamworth Phoenix official club website

BAFA National League teams
American football teams established in 2004
Sport in Staffordshire
American football teams in England
2004 establishments in England